Rais Muhammad Mehboob Ahmed is a Pakistani politician who was a Member of the Provincial Assembly of the Punjab, from August 2013 to May 2018.

Early life and education
He was born on 12 October 1964 in Multan.

He has received matriculation level education.

Political career

He was elected to the Provincial Assembly of the Punjab as a candidate of Pakistan Muslim League (Nawaz) from Constituency PP-289 (Rahimyar Khan-V) in by-polls held in August 2013.

References

Living people
Punjab MPAs 2013–2018
1964 births
Pakistan Muslim League (N) politicians